Eric Torezi Joyce (born November 21, 1978) is a former American football 
defensive back in the National Football League, NFL Europe and Arena Football League. He played for the Chicago Bears of the NFL, the Frankfurt Galaxy of NFLE, and the Nashville Kats of the AFL. Joyce played college football at Tennessee State.

References
Eric Joyce, DB at NFL.com

1978 births
Living people
Players of American football from Nashville, Tennessee
American football defensive backs
Tennessee State Tigers football players
Chicago Bears players
Frankfurt Galaxy players
Nashville Kats players